Molly May Rhone OJ, CD, OD (born November, 1944) is a Jamaican sports administrator and former netball player. She served as President of the International Netball Federation (INF) from 2003 to 2019.

Early life and education
Rhone was born November, 1944 in Manchester to parents Violet and Adolfus Dacosta. She attended Knox College, a high school in Spalding, Clarendon, where she started playing netball, and was also active in the school's athletics team. Rhone studied information technology (IT) at the Ryerson Polytechnical Institute in Toronto (Canada), graduating  with a diploma in 1969. On her return to Jamaica, she worked as IT director for the national airline Air Jamaica.

Netball career
Rhone played international games as a member of Jamaican Under-21, Under-23 and senior national netball teams, including the 1975 World Netball Championships in New Zealand, where she was the vice-captain of the Jamaican team. She was elected Vice-President of the Jamaica Netball Association (JNA) in 1991, and was elevated to the office of President in 1993. From 1999 Rhone served concurrently as vice-president of the International Netball Federation, then called the International Federation of Netball Associations (IFNA). In 2003 she was elected President of the IFNA in the same year Jamaica hosted the Netball World Championships, succeeding Sheryl Dawson of Netball New Zealand. To date, she has been the first and only Jamaican woman to head an international sporting body. On July 21, 2019, Rhone stepped down as President of the INF and was succeeded by Liz Nicholl of England Netball. She was also a member of the Jamaica Anti-Doping Commission (JADCO) and the National Olympic Committee.

Honors and awards
Rhone received her first national honour in 1999 when she was awarded the Order of Distinction, Officer Class. 
In 2007, she was the recipient of the Order of Distinction, Commander Class, for her contribution to local and international sports, in particular Netball. In 2011, she received her third national award, the Order of Jamaica, for services locally and internationally in Sports Administration, in particular, Netball

Personal life
Rhone was married to the late Jamaican golfer Izette Rhone. She has two sons.

See also
 Netball Jamaica
 International Netball Federation

References 

1944 births
Living people
Jamaican netball players
Toronto Metropolitan University alumni
Members of the Order of Jamaica
Jamaican sports executives and administrators
Netball administrators
Women sports executives and administrators
People from Manchester Parish
Commanders of the Order of Distinction
Officers of the Order of Distinction